Grand noir may refer to Grand Noir de la Calmette, a red wine hybrid grape, or one of several wine grapes with Grand noir as a synonym including:

 Baga (grape), a Portuguese wine 
 Jurançon (grape), a French wine grape from Southwest France
 Tressot, a French wine grape from Burgundy
 Aspiran Bouschet, a crossing of Aspiran noir and Bouschet Gros